Romain De Loof (born 6 March 1941) is a retired Belgian cyclist. After winning the UCI Motor-paced World Championships in 1962 and 1963 in the amateurs category, he turned professional and won another three medals in 1965–1967, including one gold. He also competed at the 1960 Summer Olympics in the 4000m team pursuit but failed to reach the final.

Between 1965 and 1970 he competed in 56 six-day track races, winning in Milan (1965; with Rik Van Steenbergen), Amsterdam and Rotterdam (both 1969; both with Peter Post). After a crash in the race of Gent-Wevelgem in 1970, he suffered a triple fracture of the pelvis and had to pause for a year. He finally retired in 1975 and later acted as the manager of professional cycling teams Ebo-Cinzia en Marc-Zeepcentrale. In February 2010, he received a medal for services to the city of Eeklo.

References

1941 births
Living people
Belgian male cyclists
Cyclists at the 1960 Summer Olympics
Olympic cyclists of Belgium
People from Eeklo
UCI Track Cycling World Champions (men)
Cyclists from East Flanders
Belgian track cyclists